The Turkmenistan national basketball team represents Turkmenistan in international competitions. It is administrated by the Basketball Federation of Turkmenistan. (Turkmen: Türkmenistanyň basketbol federasiýasy)

Turkmenistan had its last noteworthy appearance at the 2010 Asian Games where, after a long battle, it ceded to Mongolia 85–90. The country won the silver medal at the 3-on-3 basketball at the 2012 Asian Beach Games competition.

Competitions

Performance at Summer Olympics
Yet to qualify

Performance at World championships
Yet to qualify

FIBA Asia Cup

External links
Fact Sheet at FIBA Website
Asia-basket.com – Turkmenistan Men National Team

References

Men's national basketball teams
Basketball
Basketball in Turkmenistan
1998 establishments in Turkmenistan